Eugenio Mayer (29 December 1939 – 19 September 2015) was an Italian cross-country skier. He competed in the men's 50 kilometre event at the 1964 Winter Olympics.

References

External links
 

1939 births
2015 deaths
Italian male cross-country skiers
Olympic cross-country skiers of Italy
Cross-country skiers at the 1964 Winter Olympics
Sportspeople from the Province of Belluno